Adam is a figure in the Abrahamic religions.

Adam may also refer to:

Adam (given name)
Adam (surname)
Adam (murder victim), the nickname given to an unidentified boy presumed to be from southwestern Nigeria who was found murdered and dismembered in London.
Adamu (Assyrian king), the earliest Assyrian king of Middle East. He may be the inspiration for Adam.

Arts
Adam style or Adamesque, a style of interior decoration with elaborate plasterwork after three Scottish brothers
 Adam@home (previously titled Adam) newspaper comic strip, by Brian Basset and Rob Harrell

Books
Adam, a 1960 novel by David Bolt
Adam (novel), a 2008 novel by author Ted Dekker
Adam, a 2014 novel by Ariel Schrag
 Adam, a character in the Japanese manga Record of Ragnarok

Film and television
Adam (1983 film), an American drama television film
Adam (1992 film), a British stop-motion animation film
Adam (2009 film), an American romance film
Adam (2019 American film), an American comedy film
Adam (2019 Moroccan film), a Moroccan film
Adam (2020 film), an American drama film
"Adam" (Torchwood), a 2008 episode from Series 2 of the TV series Torchwood

Music
Adam (musical), a 1983 musical by Richard Ahlert about Adam Clayton Powell Jr.

Sculpture
Adam (Lombardo), a  marble sculpture by Tullio Lombardo
Adam (Rodin), an 1880–81 sculpture by Auguste Rodin
Adam (Bourdelle), an 1889 bronze sculpture by Antoine Bourdelle
Adam, a 1938–39 colossal sculpture of a head by Jacob Epstein

Companies
Adam Air, a former Indonesian airline
Adam Aircraft Industries, an aircraft manufacturer
Adam and Company, a private bank in the UK
ADAM Audio, a German loudspeaker manufacturer
Adam Hats, an American hat company
A.D.A.M., Inc., a health information company
Adam Internet, an Australian Internet service provider
Adam Motor Company, a defunct Pakistani automobile manufacturer
Adam VIII, a record label

Places
Adam, Oman, a town in Oman
Adam, Russia, several rural localities in the Udmurt Republic, Russia
Adam, West Virginia, an unincorporated community in West Virginia, US
Adam, alternative name of Geva Binyamin, an Israeli settlement in the West Bank
Adam, a village in Drăguşeni Commune, Galaţi County, Romania
Adam Range, a mountain range in Nunavut, Canada
City of Adam, a city mentioned in the Book of Joshua in the Bible

Science
ADAM (protein), a family of peptidase proteins
ADAM complex (amniotic deformity, adhesions and mutilations) or amniotic band constriction, a congenital disorder
Y-chromosomal Adam, patrilineal most recent common ancestor
Audit Data Analysis and Mining, an intrusion detection system
Adam, a Robot Scientist
Adam (tree), a giant sequoia tree in California

Technology
Coleco Adam, an early home computer
Adam tablet, a tablet computer from Notion Ink
Active Directory Application Mode, the previous name for Microsoft's Active Directory Lightweight Director Service
Opel Adam, a car
Area Defense Anti-Munitions, an experimental weapons system being developed by Lockheed Martin
Area Denial Artillery Munition, a family of US anti-personnel landmines and their carrier artillery shells
Adam (optimization algorithm), an optimization algorithm for deep learning
ADAM Program, used to help find missing children in the United States

U.S. government programs
Arrestee Drug Abuse Monitoring, a US drug-abuse-monitoring program
Code Adam, used in the US to alert the public of missing children

Other uses
Adam (drug), a street name for MDMA/ecstasy
Adam (beverage), meaning water

See also
Adams (disambiguation)
Adem (disambiguation)